Myron Edward "Mike" Ullman III (born November 26, 1946) is the former chairman and CEO of J. C. Penney.  Ullman served as Penney's CEO twice: first from December 2004 through October 2011, when he was succeeded by Ron Johnson, and then again after Johnson's departure, from April 2013 through July 2015 when Ullman stepped down.

On June 26, 2018, Ullman succeeded Howard Schultz as Chairman of Starbucks Corporation.

He has six siblings and his parents were residents of Canfield, Ohio. He is married to Cathy Emmons Ullman and has six children with her.

References 

American retail chief executives
Living people
White House Fellows
JCPenney
1947 births
Directors of Starbucks
Businesspeople in coffee